Cors Bodwrog is a mesotrophic mire and a Site of Special Scientific Interest (or SSSI) in Anglesey, North Wales. It has been designated as a Site of Special Scientific Interest since January 1961 in an attempt to protect its fragile biological elements.

Type
This site is designated due to its biological qualities. SSSIs in Wales have been notified for a total of 142 different animal species and 191 different plant species. Purple moor-grass (Molinia caerulea mire) is the principal vegetation type and a number of uncommon plants grow in Cors Bodwrog including Greater spearwort (Ranunculus lingua) and Lesser bulrush (Typha angustifolia).

The breeding bird community includes: teal, reed warbler, grasshopper warbler and curlew.

See also
List of Sites of Special Scientific Interest in Isle of Anglesey

References

External links
Natural Resources Wales website

Sites of Special Scientific Interest on Anglesey